Greg Malins (born December 5, 1967) is an American producer and screenwriter. He served as the executive producer for the American sitcom television series Friends from 1998 to 2001. Malins has been nominated for four Primetime Emmy Awards in the category Outstanding Comedy Series.

References

External links 

1967 births
Living people
People from Seattle
American male television writers
American television writers
American television producers
American male screenwriters
20th-century American screenwriters
21st-century American screenwriters